Putney is a census-designated place (CDP) and unincorporated community in Dougherty County, Georgia, United States. The population was 2,898 at the 2010 census. It is part of the Albany, Georgia Metropolitan Statistical Area.

History
A post office called Putney was established in 1897. The community was named after Francis F. Putney, a local landowner.

Geography

Putney is located in southeastern Dougherty County at  (31.473076, -84.121492). The southern border of the CDP is the Mitchell County line, and part of the western edge is the Flint River. U.S. Route 19 (the Liberty Expressway) is the main highway through Putney, leading north  to Albany and south  to Thomasville.

Demographics

As of the census of 2000, there were 2,998 people, 1,138 households, and 899 families residing in the CDP. The racial makeup of the CDP was 68.81% White, 29.52% African American, 0.13% Native American, 0.23% Asian, 0.50% from other races, and 0.80% from two or more races. Hispanic or Latino of any race were 1.00% of the population.

There were 1,138 households, out of which 31.8% had children under the age of 18 living with them, 59.7% were married couples living together, 14.8% had a female householder with no husband present, and 21.0% were non-families. 17.2% of all households were made up of individuals, and 5.4% had someone living alone who was 65 years of age or older.  The average household size was 2.63 and the average family size was 2.96.

In the CDP, the population was spread out, with 24.4% under the age of 18, 8.3% from 18 to 24, 26.5% from 25 to 44, 28.5% from 45 to 64, and 12.3% who were 65 years of age or older.  The median age was 39 years. For every 100 females, there were 96.8 males.  For every 100 females age 18 and over, there were 93.8 males.

The median income for a household in the CDP was $40,953, and the median income for a family was $44,244. Males had a median income of $35,377 versus $21,910 for females. The per capita income for the CDP was $18,828.  About 12.8% of families and 16.8% of the population were below the poverty line, including 26.9% of those under age 18 and 11.9% of those age 65 or over.

Neighborhoods
Hollands Folly
Loretta Heights

References

Census-designated places in Dougherty County, Georgia
Census-designated places in Georgia (U.S. state)
Unincorporated communities in Georgia (U.S. state)
Albany metropolitan area, Georgia